Steve Harrison (born 19 December 1972) is a New Zealand bobsledder. He competed in the four man event at the 2002 Winter Olympics.

References

External links
 

1972 births
Living people
New Zealand male bobsledders
Olympic bobsledders of New Zealand
Bobsledders at the 2002 Winter Olympics
Sportspeople from Auckland